Roshni Kaur Soin is a beauty queen who was named Miss Singapore World in 2007 and went on to represent Singapore in Miss World 2007 in China.  She studied for a Psychology diploma in MDIS and works as a model.

In 2010, she joined the cast of Supermodel Me (season 2) as one of the 12 aspiring models.

References

1986 births
Living people
Miss World 2007 delegates
Singaporean beauty pageant winners